The Play-offs of the 2009 Fed Cup Europe/Africa Zone Group I were the final stages of the Group I Zonal Competition involving teams from Europe and Africa. Using the positions determined in their pools, the sixteen teams faced off to determine their placing in the 2009 Fed Cup Europe/Africa Zone Group I. The top two teams advanced to World Group II play-offs, and the bottom two teams were relegated down to the Europe/Africa Zone Group II for the next year.

Promotion play-offs
The first placed teams of each pool were placed against each other in two head-to-head rounds. The winner of the rounds advanced to the World Group II play-offs, where they would get a chance to advance to the World Group II for next year.

Great Britain vs. Poland

Belarus vs. Estonia

Fifth to Seventh play-offs
The second placed teams of each pool were placed against each other in two ties. The winner of each tie was allocated fifth place in the Group while the losers were allocated seventh.

Hungary vs. Sweden

Denmark vs. Croatia

Ninth
Due to the fact that there were an odd number of teams in Pool D (three), as opposed to the four teams in the other pools, all the teams that placed third in the pools with four teams (and ) were allocated ninth place.

Relegation play-offs
The last placed teams of each pool were placed against each other in two ties. The losing team of the rounds were relegated to Group II for next year.

Luxembourg vs. Austria

Bosnia and Herzegovina vs. Bulgaria

Final Placements

  and  advanced to the World Group II Play-offs. The Poles were drawn against , and they won 3–2, which thus caused them to advance to 2009 World Group II. The Estonians were drawn against , and they also won 3–2, and therefore also advanced to World Group II.

See also
Fed Cup structure

References

External links
 Fed Cup website

2009 Fed Cup Europe/Africa Zone